Khalis is a given name and surname. Notable people with the name include:

Khalis Bayyan or Ronald Bell (1951–2020), American singer-songwriter
Mehdi Khalis (born 1989), Moroccan footballer
Mohammad Yunus Khalis (c. 1919–2006), Afghan mujahideen commander

See also
Kalis (surname)